Capel Bangor railway station is a railway station serving Capel Bangor in Ceredigion in Mid-Wales. It is an intermediate station on the preserved Vale of Rheidol Railway. Facilities include a passing loop (allowing two trains to pass in opposite directions) and sidings which also link the main running line with a storage shed. There is a station building, the current structure being completed in 2013.

History and Description

The village community at Capel Bangor was once much larger than it is today, and in the earliest days of the Vale of Rheidol Railway Capel Bangor was the third principal station along with the two termini. It had a resident Station Master, and was equipped with waiting shelters, booking office, passing loop, sidings, and a large carriage shed. These facilities were all removed with the gradual decline of the village population, although in the 1980s British Rail, then the operators of this line, rebuilt a stone waiting shelter, and provided a picnic area for passengers alighting from trains here.

In 2001 the new operator embarked upon a process of restoration of operating facilities at Capel Bangor. The passing loop was restored, as was a single carriage siding, accessed 'out and back' via a lengthy headshunt. Subsequently, the 1980s waiting shelter was demolished, but the single carriage siding was joined by a second, parallel line (accessed via the same headshunt), and a large modern train shed was constructed.

European Union funding
In 2012 a substantial grant from the European Union for infrastructure development in rural communities led to the Vale of Rheidol Railway making substantial investment in its smaller stations. At Capel Bangor this funding allowed for the construction of two raised and surfaced platforms, permitting passengers to join or alight from trains on the level, and also the construction of a station building, based upon one of the station's original structures. Funding also permitted fencing work, and the development of a station garden. The new station building includes an open waiting shelter for passengers, and a station office. The facilities were completed in time for the 2013 operating season.

References

Heritage railway stations in Ceredigion
Vale of Rheidol Railway stations
Railway stations in Great Britain opened in 1902
Railway stations in Great Britain closed in 1939
Railway stations in Great Britain opened in 1945